DMW may refer to:

Deutsche Medizinische Wochenschrift, a German medical journal
DMW Motorcycles, UK
Carroll County Regional Airport, an airport with FAA 3-letter code DMW.
Drever, McCusker, Woomble, three Scottish musicians who collaborated on the album Before the Ruin
Department of Migrant Workers, an executive department of the Philippine government